The Claydon Treasure Mystery is a 1938 film directed by H. Manning Haynes and starring John Stuart, Garry Marsh and Evelyn Ankers. Murder at a large old manor house attracts the attentions of a mystery writer. It was made at Wembley Studios as a quota quickie by the British subsidiary of 20th Century Fox.

Plot
Lady Caroline (Annie Esmond) invites engineer and part-time crime writer Peter Kerrigan (John Stuart) to Marsh Manor to solve a murder. Is the mysterious death of a librarian connected with the Claydon treasure, reputedly hidden on the estate a century earlier?

Cast
John Stuart as Peter Kerrigan
Garry Marsh as Sir George Ilford
Evelyn Ankers as Rosemary Shackleford
Annie Esmond as Lady Caroline Claydon
Campbell Gullan as Tollemache
Aubrey Mallalieu as Lord Claydon
Finlay Currie as Rubin
Joss Ambler as Inspector Fleming
Vernon Harris as Rhodes, the Butler

References

Bibliography
 Chibnall, Steve. Quota Quickies: The Birth of the British 'B' Film. British Film Institute, 2007.
 Low, Rachael. Filmmaking in 1930s Britain. George Allen & Unwin, 1985.
 Wood, Linda. British Films, 1927-1939. British Film Institute, 1986.

External links
 The Claydon Treasure Mystery in the Internet Movie Database

1938 films
1938 crime drama films
Films set in London
Quota quickies
Films directed by H. Manning Haynes
Films shot at Wembley Studios
British crime drama films
20th Century Fox films
British black-and-white films
1930s English-language films
1930s British films